The Seer is the twelfth studio album by American experimental rock band Swans and was released on August 28, 2012 by Gira's own record label Young God Records. Producer and frontman Michael Gira funded the recording of the album with the sales of We Rose from Your Bed with the Sun in Our Head.

While the previous studio album My Father Will Guide Me up a Rope to the Sky was seen as a cross between Gira's solo project Angels of Light and late Swans, The Seer strayed away from Angels of Light's more accessible songs and lyricism, focusing more around sonic landscapes. The album features a variety of instrumentation and guest musicians, including the post-punk band Yeah Yeah Yeahs vocalist Karen O and former Swans member Jarboe. The album is noteworthy due to its extended song lengths, particularly its over thirty minute title track, as well as its frequent experimentation with drone and noise elements. The album garnered critical acclaim from mainstream publications and appeared in publications' best of the year album lists. The Seer is considered the first part of a three-album "trilogy", the other albums being To Be Kind, which followed, and The Glowing Man, which followed To Be Kind.

Background
The album was funded with the sales of the live double album We Rose from Your Bed with the Sun in Our Head as frontman Michael Gira stated that the rise of internet piracy caused a need to fund records in this fashion. He described the album as taking "30 years to make" and is "the culmination of every previous Swans album as well as any other music I've ever made." Describing the songwriting process, Gira said, "The songs began on an acoustic guitar, then were fleshed out with (invaluable) help from my friends, then were further tortured and seduced in the studio, and now they await further cannibalism and force-feeding as we prepare to perform some of them live, at which point they'll mutate further, endlessly, or perhaps be discarded for a while." The songs "93 Ave. B Blues," "The Seer," "The Apostate," and "Avatar" were developed during tours and rehearsals while the rest of the songs were created in the studio. While their previous effort was seen as a continuation of Gira's folk solo project Angels of Light mixed with Swans' original elements, Gira stated that The Seer was more focused as a Swans effort due to touring.

The band started recording in Berlin after a hiatus during touring as Gira wanted to get it done while they were a live band. After a year of touring, they recorded in New York while Gira spent the next five months doing overdubs and fleshing out songs written on his acoustic guitar. While Gira sings on the majority of the songs, he enlisted Karen O to assist with singing "Song for a Warrior" because Gira believed that "Since the song is like a country lullaby, I thought it would be appropriate for a female. Chris [Pravdica, Swans' bass player] pointed me to a few of Karen's solo works where she sings in this really gentle, compassionate, soulful way." Former Swans member Jarboe also made an appearance on the album once Gira met her after an Atlanta tour as he needed "some female vocals doing these kind of drone chords." The name of the album and title track came from Swans performing the title track multiple times instrumentally until Gira soon sang, "I see it all, I see it all," which he thought fit the music. The artwork from the album was based on a tempera wolf painting by Simon Henwood and featured Gira's teeth on the wolf.

Critical reception

Upon its release, The Seer was widely praised by music critics. At Metacritic, which assigns a normalized rating out of 100 to reviews from critics, the album received an average score of 87, based on 32 reviews, indicating "universal acclaim". Writing for Rolling Stone, Will Hermes called the album Swans' "grandest statement yet" and described the title track as "a season in hell, and then some." Also describing the title track, Jason Heller of The A.V. Club wrote, "It's the most harrowing, exhausting, cathartic, transcendental piece of music Gira has ever put to tape." Thom Jurek of AllMusic described The Seer as "the most sprawling, ambitious, thoughtfully conceived and tightly performed recording in the band's catalog." The Guardians Dave Simpson wrote that the album "won't be for everybody, but deserves to win new converts."

Several music criticism websites included The Seer on their lists of the best albums of 2012. Stereogum ranked the album at fourth in their top 50 albums. Pitchfork ranked it at fifth, with writer Stuart Berman writing that The Seer "evinces a magisterial grandeur and hypnotic allure, elevating Swans’ seedy, sewer-scraping depravity into an extravagant, cinematically scaled noise." Sputnikmusic staff member SowingSeason said that The Seer "could be the best album of Michael Gira's thirty year career" and was the best of 2012. The A.V. Club staff ranked the album seventh in their best of 2012 list and stated that "Gira did the seemingly impossible and topped [My Father], however, with the Seer". Commercially, the album peaked at number 114 on the Billboard 200 and at number 22 on the Independent Albums chart.

Track listing

The album featured a different track order for its vinyl release.

Personnel
Adapted from Gira's Young God Records website.

Swans
 Michael Gira – lead vocals, acoustic guitar, electric guitar, harmonica, Casio, sounds
 Kristof Hahn – lap steel guitar, electric guitars, additional vocals
 Thor Harris – drums, percussion, orchestral bells, hammered dulcimer, vibraphone, piano, clarinet, handmade violin
 Christopher Pravdica – bass guitar, additional vocals, incredible handshake
 Phil Puleo – drums, percussion, hammered dulcimer, additional vocals
 Norman Westberg – electric guitar, additional vocals
Guests
 Bill Rieflin – piano, organ, electric guitar, acoustic guitar, drums, percussion, Casio, synthesizer, bass guitar, additional vocals, bird idea; credited as "honorary Swan"
 Karen O – lead vocals on "Song for a Warrior"
 Alan Sparhawk and Mimi Parker – co-vocals on "Lunacy"
 Jarboe – backing vocals on "The Seer Returns" and "A Piece of the Sky", voice collage on "A Piece of the Sky"
 Seth Olinsky, Miles Seaton, and Dana Janssen – background vocals on "A Piece of the Sky"
 Caleb Mulkerin and Colleen Kinsella – accordion, additional vocals, dulcimer, guitar, piano and other instruments on "The Seer Returns"
 Sean Mackowiak – acoustic and electric mandolin, clarinet
 Ben Frost – fire sounds (acoustic and synthetic) on "A Piece of the Sky"
 Iain Graham – bagpipes on "The Seer"
 Bruce Lamont – horns on "The Seer"
 Bob Rutman – steel cello on "The Seer"
 Cassis Staudt – accordion
 Eszter Balint – violin
 Jane Scarpantoni – cello
 Kevin McMahon – additional drums on "The Seer Returns" and "Avatar", additional guitars on "Song for a Warrior" and "Avatar"
 Bryce Goggin – piano on "Song for a Warrior"
 Bill Tobin – Oboe on “Avatar”
 Stefan Rocke – contrabassoon on "The Seer"
Technical personnel
 Michael Gira – producing
 Kevin McMahon – engineering, mixing
 Macro and Boris – engineering assistants of Kevin McMahon
 Bryce Goggin – engineering
 Adam Sachs – engineering assistant of Bruce Goggin
 Doug Henderson – mastering
 Jamal Ruhe – pre-mastering
 Simon Henwood – artwork

Charts

References

External links
 

2012 albums
Swans (band) albums
Young God Records albums
Albums produced by Michael Gira